The Sayre House is located in Madison, Morris County, New Jersey, United States. The house was built c. 1745 and added to the National Register of Historic Places on February 12, 1980.

According to two signs on the front of the house, General Anthony Wayne occupied the house in 1777 while the continental army was encamped in the area.

See also
National Register of Historic Places listings in Morris County, New Jersey

References

Houses on the National Register of Historic Places in New Jersey
Houses in Morris County, New Jersey
Madison, New Jersey
National Register of Historic Places in Morris County, New Jersey
New Jersey Register of Historic Places